Portage—Interlake was a federal electoral district in the province of Manitoba, Canada, that was represented in the House of Commons of Canada from 1988 to 1997.

This riding was created in 1987 from parts of Lisgar, Portage—Marquette and Selkirk—Interlake ridings.

Portage—Interlake consisted of an area south of Lake Winnipeg.

The electoral district was abolished in 1996 when it was redistributed between Portage—Lisgar and Selkirk—Interlake ridings.

Electoral history

See also 

 List of Canadian federal electoral districts
 Past Canadian electoral districts

External links 
 

Former federal electoral districts of Manitoba